Teófilo Davis Bell (born 25 July 1929, date of death unknown) was a Venezuelan hurdler who competed in the 1952 Summer Olympics.  Davis finished fifth in the 1955 Pan American Games 110 metres hurdles and seventh in the high jump.

References

1929 births
Year of death missing
Venezuelan male high jumpers
Venezuelan male hurdlers
Olympic athletes of Venezuela
Athletes (track and field) at the 1952 Summer Olympics
Pan American Games competitors for Venezuela
Athletes (track and field) at the 1951 Pan American Games
Athletes (track and field) at the 1955 Pan American Games
Central American and Caribbean Games gold medalists for Venezuela
Competitors at the 1959 Central American and Caribbean Games
Central American and Caribbean Games medalists in athletics